El Asiento is a ward and village in the municipality of  Chambas, Ciego de Ávila Province, Cuba.

Culture
In the village and nearby CNA (Non-Agricultural Cooperative) they carry out the traditional Peñas Campesinas. With most of Central Cuba they also carry out the Parrandas.

Geography
The ward has a flat relief, good vegetation stable for the entire year, and surrounded by mountains where limestone is common.

References

External links
El Asiento (Chambas) - EcuRed 
Populated places in Ciego de Ávila Province